Thallacheruvu is a village in Guntur district of the Indian state of Andhra Pradesh. It is located in Atchampeta mandal of Guntur revenue division.
 It is a part of Andhra Pradesh Capital Region.

Geography 
Thallacheruvu is located at 

16.453691_N_80.303879_E_ in Achampet Mandal, situated towards north-west of Guntur, in the state of Andhra Pradesh in India.

Thallacheruvu means, Thalla + Cheruvu . Thalla means Thati chetlu (Palm Trees) Cheruvu means pond or lake. The majority of people here are Catholics.

References 

Villages in Guntur district